Zygmunt Białostocki (15 August 1897 – c. 1942)  was a Polish Jewish musician and composer. He composed many popular Polish pre-war songs, and worked as conductor and a première pianist in Warsaw between the World Wars.

Life
Białostocki was born in Białystok, Poland. Between 1925–1930 he worked as music director and conductor in the Municipal Theatre in Łódź. Later he moved to Warsaw, where he worked in  “revue-theaters” and cabarets (within what is known in Yiddish as kleynkunst), including Perskie Oko, Morskie Oko, Nowy Momus, and Nowy Ananas.

He worked with the lyricist Zenon Friedwald (Zenon Frivald-Vardan). His song M’ken nisht tsvingen tsu keyn libe was popularized by the film actor and singer Eugeniusz Bodo in the Polish version called Nie można kogoś zmuszać do miłości. His tango Rebeka, built on Chasidic motifs and sung by Chasidic Jews as a zemer was popular in nightclubs, coffee houses and restaurants across Warsaw between the wars. The lyrics were written by Andrzej Włast; the song was first recorded by Zofia Terne (1932) and premiered at the Morskie Oko cabaret, performed by Dora Kalinówna.

In 1932 he was the music director and composer of the score for Biała trucizna (White Venom) movie. In 1933 he worked as accompanist in the Warsaw Nowy Momus and Oasis cabarets, in the Warsaw-Prague Perskie Oko cabaret and in the Warsaw Nowy Ananas theater. His musical comedy called Miłość i złoto (Love and gold), written with Józef Haftman, opened in December 1933 at the Teatr 8:30.

Apart from Rebeka, Białostocki's other szlagiery (hits) included:

foxtrots: Ach, te Rumunki, Katiusza, Andriusza, Ecie-pecie (lyrics by himself);
tangos: Jesienne marzenia, Andrusowskie tango, Pomalutku, po cichutku (lyrics by Andrzej Włast), Szczęście trzeba rwać jak świeże wiśnie and Zoboth (lyrics by W. Jastrzębiec). and Choć goło lecz wesoło (lyrics by Alexander Jellin), Nasze kawalerskie, Noc jesienna (lyrics by Zbigniew Drabik Argus, 1936), Na dnie serca, Nie można zmuszać do miłości, Pieśń o matce (Song about mother) (lyrics by Tadeusz Zeromski and Jerzy Wrzos, sung by Stefan Witas, 1933),

His wife Sofia was also a composer.

After the German invasion on Poland in 1939 and German occupation of Poland the Białostockis were forced to live in the ghetto in Warsaw. They are mentioned in Stanisław Adler’s Warsaw ghetto memoir.

Zygmunt Białostocki was murdered by Germans during the liquidation of the Warsaw ghetto, most probably in 1942.

See also
Music of Poland
List of Poles

References

External links

Songs and Songwriters at yivoencyclopedia.org
Antalogia at spotkaniaziosenka.org

 Scores by Zygmunt Białostocki in digital library Polona

1897 births
1942 deaths
Jewish cabaret performers
People from Białystok
Polish composers
Polish conductors (music)
Male conductors (music)
Polish cabaret performers
Jewish composers
Jewish songwriters
People who died in the Warsaw Ghetto
Polish Jews who died in the Holocaust
20th-century conductors (music)
20th-century Polish pianists
20th-century comedians
20th-century male musicians
Artists from Białystok